The 1971 Chatham Cup was the 44th annual nationwide knockout football competition in New Zealand.

Early stages of the competition were run on a regional basis, with the National League teams receiving a bye until the later stages of the competition. In all, 99 teams took part in the competition. Note: Different sources give different numberings for the rounds of the competition: some start round one with the beginning of the regional qualifications; others start numbering from the first national knock-out stage. The former numbering scheme is used in this article.

The 1971 final
Prior to the changes in the organisation of the competition in 1970, finals were always between North Island and South Island teams. With the reorganisation of the draw, this was no longer the case, and so the 1971 final became the first local derby ever to be played out in the final, with both teams coming from Wellington. 

In the final, Western Suburbs made up for their defeat the previous year by seeing of neighbours Wellington City, who had been formed as a national league side through a merger of Miramar Rangers and Hungaria. In a howling Wellington southerly wind, Dave Wallace and Allan Jeffrey scored for Suburbs while Paul Cameron and Julius Beck countered for City. With the scores tied, the teams went to extra time, where the game remained locked at 2-2 until the last moments. With the final kick of the game Barry Humphreys sent a long ball forward which caught the breeze and bounced over the City keeper into his net.

Results

Third round

* Te Atatu won on corners 

† Due to the regional nature of the early part of the competition, Caversham and Invercargill United both progressed to a regional play-off, despite their losses in this round of the competition

Fourth round

* Moturoa won on corners

Fifth round

Sixth Round

* Miramar Rangers won on corners.

Quarter-finals

Semi-finals

Final

References

Rec.Sport.Soccer Statistics Foundation New Zealand 1971 page
UltimateNZSoccer website 1971 Chatham Cup page

Chatham Cup
Chatham Cup
Chatham Cup
September 1971 sports events in New Zealand